Xu Xin (born 8 January 1990) is a Chinese professional table tennis player who is currently ranked world No. 108 as of December 2022 for men's singles by the International Table Tennis Federation (ITTF). He first reached his career-high singles ranking of world No. 1 in January 2013.

He has won 17 World Tour Singles titles and has won the World Championships in men's doubles thrice, mixed doubles twice, and five times in the team event. In addition, Xu Xin along with Ma Long and Zhang Jike won the men's team gold medal at the 2016 Summer Olympics in Rio de Janeiro.

Playing style and equipment

Xu Xin is one of the few penhold grip players in China, especially among the younger generation who are mostly shakehand players. He follows the footsteps of other penhold champions such as Wang Hao and Ma Lin.

With his long arms and frame, he is able to more easily reach balls hit wide. His long arms enable a graceful, unique forehand loop, with his arm almost fully outstretched. He has also adopted the reverse penhold backhand grip (RPB), a recent development for China's penholders, allowing a two-winged attack. He still uses a traditional penhold (Chinese) backhand to lob and push the ball with the forehand side of his racket. More recently, Xu Xin has been more willing to counter with his RPB, allowing him to maintain aggression in the points on his backhand side.

Xu Xin's main strength is his shot variation and fast forehand loops, often stepping very deep into his backhand corner to use his forehand. He sets these shots up with his extremely spinny and deceptive serves, and has some of the best footwork in table tennis. He is also something of a 'crowd entertainer’, often coming up with wild, and sometimes inappropriate, shots. He has been dubbed the 'show man' in recent years. This is perhaps due to his playful nature and confidence in playing. He admitted that he hopes to try to be more efficient and effective with his shot selection as he matures and carries more responsibilities. More recently, Xu Xin has been called "XUperman", referring to his many "superman-like" moments. These names have been widely popularized by the use of Adam Bobrow, an ITTF commentator.

Career

2013
In January 2013, he reached the No. 1 spot in the World Rankings thanks to the points obtained by winning the ITTF World Tour Grand Finals in December 2012.

2014
In January 2014, Xu Xin defended his title by beating world No. 1 ranked Ma Long in the finals match of the 2013 ITTF World Tour Grand Finals held in Dubai.

2016
In 2016, Xu Xin defeated world No. 1 ranked and current World Champion Ma Long 4–2 in the semi-finals match of the 2016 Japan Open, but then was beaten by world No. 2 ranked Fan Zhendong in the finals. One week later after the Japan Open, Xu Xin won his third Korea Open title after beating Ma Long again 4–3 in the finals.

However, he was deemed not good enough to be entered into the singles tournament of the Rio 2016 Summer Olympics.

2017
In late 2017, he had a disappointing German Open, where in doubles Xu and his partner Fan Zhendong were knocked out in the Round of 16, and lost in the Quarterfinals to Lee Sang-su 4–0 in the singles event. In the Swedish Open, he won the doubles event with Fan Zhendong, before defeating Fan, the world No. 2, 4–1 one hour later in the Men's Singles event. At the 2017 ITTF World Tour Grand Finals, Xu Xin was seeded 5th and lost to 3rd seed Fan Zhendong in the quarter-finals.

2018
Xu Xin started his 2018 year by participating with teammates Ma Long, Fan Zhendong, Lin Gaoyuan and Yu Ziyang in the 2018 ITTF Team World Cup, beating Japan in the final. During the tournament, Xu only dropped one set.

Xu Xin entered one of the six platinum events of the tour, the Qatar Open, seeking an unprecedented fourth title. He almost suffered a defeat to Zhou Yu winning 4–3, but he was beaten by Fan Zhendong in the semi-finals 4–1. The following day, Xu Xin along with Fan Zhendong beat Jun Mizutani and Yuya Oshima to claim the men's doubles title. One week later at the German Open, Xu was seeded third but lost to fifth seeded Ma Long in the final. Xu Xin partnered Ma Long to claim his second doubles title of the year defeating Lee Sang-su and Jeong Young-sik in the final.

The next month, Xu Xin was a part of the winning team China at the 2018 World Team Table Tennis Championships in his tenth appearance at the World Championships. Xu earned the final point for team China during the final, beating Patrick Franziska 3–1 for China to claim the title with a 3–0 win over Germany.

At the China Open, Xu Xin was looking for his first World Tour title of the year. However, his ambitions were stopped in his home country by Lim Jong-hoon in the Round of 32. At the next World Tour platinum event, the Korea Open, Xu Xin was seeded 3rd but lost in the Round of 16 to Jang Woo-jin.

Looking to redeem himself, Xu Xin claimed the title at the Australian Open beating qualifier Liu Dingshuo in the final, Xu Xin's first World Tour title of the year. Right after that, Xu Xin claimed another title at the Bulgaria Open beating Japan's Kenta Matsudaira in the final. Xu Xin claimed his third men's doubles titles with Ma Long at the Bulgarian Open, their second title as a pair in 2018.

Because of his lack of participation in the Asian Cup earlier that year, Xu Xin did not participate in the 2018 ITTF Men's World Cup.

At the Swedish Open, Xu Xin was looking to defend his title, but lost to top seed Fan Zhendong in the final. Two days later at the Austrian Open, Xu Xin lost in the final to qualifier Liang Jingkun 4–3 after Liang Jingkun had stunningly beat Fan Zhendong 4–2 in the semi-finals. Xu also claimed his first mixed doubles title ever at the Austrian Open, winning with Liu Shiwen over Cheng-I-Ching and Chen Chien-an in the final.

Due to Xu's appearance in five finals and claiming two of the titles, Xu Xin was seeded first in the 2018 ITTF World Tour Grand Finals, followed closely by Fan Zhendong, Ma Long, and Liang Jingkun. Xu Xin lost to compatriot Lin Gaoyuan in the quarter-finals, 4–2.

2019 

Xu Xin started off the year at the 2019 Hungarian Open where he reached the semi-finals. Xu Xin lost to the eventual champion Lin Gaoyuan.

At the Qatar Open, Xu Xin faced off against his old rival Ma Long in the semi-final stage. Ma Long had just returned from injury and was making his first appearance on the ITTF World Tour since many months before. In a highly anticipated match, Xu Xin eventually lost to eventual champion Ma Long, where he beat Lin Gaoyuan in the finals.

Heading in as the number 2 seed at the 2019 ITTF World Table Tennis Championships, Xu Xin was looking to prove himself during this competition. He participated in the men's singles and mixed doubles with Liu Shiwen. After the draw was made, Xu Xin was the only Chinese player in the bottom half of the draw. Because of the seedings, #1 Fan Zhendong, #3 Lin Gaoyuan, #9 Liang Jingkun, and #11 Ma Long were all drawn in the top half of the draw. Much pressure was placed on Xu to help achieve an all Chinese final, but was also a large opportunity for Xu Xin to perform well at a World Championships. Xu Xin won his first round 4–1 against Jan Zibrat and his second round 4–0 over Austria's Stefan Fegerl. However, Xu's road to the final was stopped by Frenchman Simon Gauzy 4–2. Gauzy outperformed Xu and Gauzy is even said to have "outspinned the spin master". Xu's shocking defeat meant that for the first time in over 15 years, there would not be an all Chinese final. The last time this happened was at the 2003 World Championships, where Austria's Werner Schlager faced off against Joo Saehyuk in the men's final. In the mixed doubles event, Xu did not falter, where Xu Xin and Liu Shiwen claimed victory 4–1 over Kasumi Ishikawa and Maharu Yoshimura.

At the 2019 Japan Open, Xu Xin became the second person in history to achieve a coveted "triple crown", the first being Jang Woojin at the 2018 Korea Open. Xu Xin claimed the champion in singles, men's doubles, and mixed doubles. In the men's singles final, Xu Xin defeated Lin Yun-ju, "the silent assassin", in a highly anticipated final. Xu Xin claimed doubles titles with Fan Zhendong and Zhu Yuling.

Xu Xin's performance at the Japan Open was enough to place him again at number one in the world, a position that he last held in early 2015. He replaced Fan Zhendong from the position, who had previously held the spot for over a year. Fan Zhendong dropped to #3 in the world rankings.

The following week at the Korea Open, Xu Xin once again claimed the singles title in the final, defeating his good-friend Ma Long in the final. Coming into the final, Xu Xin had lost his six previous encounters against Ma Long on the international stage, and Ma was heavily regarded as the favorite to win. After an amazing match, Xu Xin said that "Winning the title is not the reason I am feeling so happy. It’s because I beat Ma Long", paying homage to Ma Long's dominance over the past years. Xu Xin again won the men's doubles title with Fan Zhendong, but in the mixed doubles Xu Xin and Liu Shiwen were defeated by Wong Chun Ting and Doo Hoi Kem at the final stage. This marked the first ever loss for the pairing of Xu Xin and Liu Shiwen, recent mixed doubles world champions at the 2019 ITTF World Table Tennis Championships.

The next week at the Australian Open, Xu Xin claimed three men's singles championships in a row on the ITTF World Tour, and became the first person to successfully defend a men's singles title at the Australian Open. Xu Xin beat his colleague Wang Chuqin in the final 4–0; Wang Chuqin had defeated Ma Long at the semi-final stage.

After the Australian Open, the first of the T2 Events were played in Malaysia. In this tournament, Xu Xin showed signs of slowness and tiredness, proposed to be due to the many weeks of play on the world tour. Xu Xin made it to the semi-finals, where he lost to Fan Zhendong 4–0 in a rematch of their semi-final match at the Japan Open earlier this year, where Xu won 4–3.

Many of the Chinese players have vocalized their dislike of many ITTF events being played one after the other, with no real breaks in between. After the final in Australia, Xu Xin responded "too tired". Ma Long and other Chinese players also said the same, but it is said that competitions must be played in order to maintain higher world rankings for the Chinese players, all in preparation for Tokyo 2020.

At the 2019 Chinese National Championships, Xu Xin and four of his other prominent colleagues, Ma Long, Fan Zhendong, Liu Shiwen, and Ding Ning all pulled out of the competition. Their reasoning was for them to rest up after they had just played several events back to back on the ITTF World Tour.

Xu Xin ended the year as the World No. 1.

Due to his outstanding performances and showman-like qualities, Xu Xin gained the nickname of "XUperman", holding true to his superhuman play. This nickname is one of Xu Xin's many, the others being the Showman and the Cloudwalker, all descriptive of his playing style.

2021 
Xu Xin was originally slated to play at WTT Doha in March, but along with the rest of the Chinese national team, he withdrew from all international events until the Tokyo Olympics due to pandemic concerns. Xu played in the China National Qualification event in March and the Chinese Olympic Scrimmage in May, where he lost to several lesser known and lower ranked players.

In May, Xu was selected to represent China in the team event of the Tokyo Olympics. Xu reached the finals of the second leg of the Chinese Olympic Scrimmage, where he lost 4–3 to Fan Zhendong despite holding an 8-4 and 3–1 lead.

In July, Liu Shiwen and Xu Xin won silver in the mixed doubles event at the Tokyo Olympics being upset 4-3 by Japan's Mima Ito and Jun Mizutani despite initially leading 2–0.

In September, Xu reached the quarter-finals at the China National Games. After his round of 16 win over Zhou Yu, Xu noted that he had recently been investing more of himself into his family rather than purely table tennis. Xu lost to Liu Dingshuo in the quarter-finals, but went on to win gold in the mixed doubles event later that day.

Career statistics

ITTF Major tournament performance timeline

(W) Won; (F) finalist; (SF) semi-finalist; (QF) quarterfinalist; (#R) rounds 4, 3, 2, 1; (RR) round-robin stage; (A) Absent; (NH) Not Held; (S) Singles Tournament; (D) Doubles Tournament; (XD) Mixed Doubles Tournament; (T) Team Tournament.

Senior career highlights, as of April 2018:

Singles
World Championships: SF (2013, 2017).
World Cup appearances: 3. Record: winner (2013), runner up (2016), 4th (2012).
World Tour winner (×18): Kuwait Open 2010; Slovenian Open 2011, Qatar Open 2011; Qatar Open 2012; China Open 2012, Russian Open 2012, Korea Open 2013; Qatar Open 2014, Korea Open 2014; Japan (Yokohama) Open 2015; Korea Open 2016; Swedish Open 2017, Australia Open 2018; Bulgaria Open 2018, Japan Open 2019, Korean Open 2019, Australian Open 2019; German Open 2020.                                                                                                                             Runner-up (×11): Belarus Open 2008; Korea Open 2012; China Open 2013; China Open 2014; Kuwait Open 2015, China Open 2015, Swedish Open 2015, Japan Open 2016, German Open 2018; Swedish Open 2018, Austrian Open 2018.
World Tour Grand Finals appearances: 6. Record: winner (2012, 2013), runner up (2009, 2010), SF (2015, 16), QF (2017, 2018).
Asian Games: winner (2014).
Asian Championships: winner (2019); runner-up (2015); SF (2009, 12).
Asian Cup: winner (2012, 13, 15, 16); 2nd (2011); 3rd (2010).

Doubles
World Championships: winner (2011, 15, 17); runner-up (2009).
World Tour winner (×28): Slovenian Open 2009, Danish Open 2009, Qatar Open 2009, China Open 2010, English Open 2011, Qatar Open 2011, Qatar Open 2012, Russian Open 2012, Korea Open 2012, China Open 2012, Kuwait Open 2013, China Open 2013, Swedish Open 2013, Japan Open 2015, China Open 2015, Swedish Open 2015, Kuwait Open 2016, Japan (Tokyo) Open 2016, Korea Open 2016, Japan Open 2017, Swedish Open 2017, German Open 2018, Bulgaria Open 2018, Hungarian Open 2019, Japan Open 2019, Korea Open 2019, Swedish Open 2019; German Open 2019.Runner-up (×10): China (Suzhou) Open 2009; Qatar Open 2010, Kuwait Open 2010; UAE Open 2011; Hungarian Open 2012, Slovenian Open 2012; Swedish Open 2014, China Open 2014; Kuwait Open 2015; China Open 2016.
Asian Games: runner-up (2010, 14).
Asian Championships: winner (2009, 15), runner-up (2013, 2019).

Mixed doubles
Olympics: Runner-up (2020).
World Championships: winner (2015, 2019), QF (2009).
World Tour winner (x6): Austrian Open 2018, Hungarian Open 2019, Qatar Open 2019, Japan Open 2019, Swedish Open 2019; German Open 2019.Runner-up (×1): Korea Open 2019
Asian Games: winner (2010).
Asian Championships: winner (2012, 2019), SF (2009).

Team
Olympic Games: winner (2016, 2020).
World Championships: winner (2010, 12, 14, 16, 18).
World Team Cup: winner (2009, 10, 11, 13, 15, 18).
Asian Games: winner (2010, 14).
Asian Championships: winner (2009, 12, 13, 15, 17, 19).

Summary of Accomplishments

 2x Olympic Champion (2 Team)
 10x World Champion (5 Doubles, 5 Team)
 7x World Cup winner (1 Singles, 6 Team)
 51x ITTF World Tour winner (18 Singles, 28 Doubles, 6 Mixed Doubles)
 2x ITTF World Tour Grand Finals Champion (2 Singles)
 4x Asian Games winner (1 Singles, 1 Mixed Doubles, 2 Team)
 11x Asian Champion (1 Singles, 2 Doubles, 2 Mixed Doubles, 6 Team)
 4x Asian Cup winner (4 Singles)

Personal life
Xu Xin married table tennis player Yao Yan in 2016. They welcomed a son in September 2019.

As a child he attended a sports school in Jiangsu province. He sat next to badminton player Wang Shixian during his classes.

References

External links

Living people
1990 births
Table tennis players from Jiangsu
Sportspeople from Xuzhou
Chinese male table tennis players
Olympic table tennis players of China
Olympic medalists in table tennis
2016 Olympic gold medalists for China
Olympic gold medalists for China
Olympic silver medalists for China
Medalists at the 2016 Summer Olympics
Medalists at the 2020 Summer Olympics
Table tennis players at the 2016 Summer Olympics
Table tennis players at the 2020 Summer Olympics
World Table Tennis Championships medalists
Asian Games medalists in table tennis
Asian Games gold medalists for China
Asian Games silver medalists for China
Medalists at the 2010 Asian Games
Medalists at the 2014 Asian Games
Table tennis players at the 2010 Asian Games
Table tennis players at the 2014 Asian Games
Universiade medalists in table tennis
Universiade gold medalists for China
Medalists at the 2009 Summer Universiade
Medalists at the 2011 Summer Universiade